The UK Research Integrity Office (UKRIO), established in 2006 is an independent body in the United Kingdom "which provides expert advice and guidance about the conduct of research".  The UKRIO is a registered charity.

References

Further reading
William Courtney, A private researcher's struggles against research fraud. I. A case study, Journal of Biological Physics and Chemistry 16 (2016) 142–156 [This paper claims to expose fraudulent behaviour within the UKRIO.]

External links
Official website

Charities based in the United Kingdom
2006 establishments in the United Kingdom
Organizations established in 2006
Research in the United Kingdom